The Raven's Claw is an all-male senior honorary society at Dickinson College. It was founded in 1896, making it the first society unique to Dickinson College and one of the oldest in the country. Membership is limited to seven senior men who are selected by the seven previous members. The new members are chosen based on a variety of factors, which are speculated to include: campus leadership, a solid academic record, and athletic participation. While those are often the factors associated with membership in the Raven's Claw Society, no one knows for certain how or why members are selected. New members are inducted in a "Tapping Ceremony" which is held on the "Old Stone Steps of Old West." The ceremony is traditionally conducted during commencement weekend. They are called "claws" or "white hats", denoting the white caps they wear around campus to signify unity and loyalty on certain days throughout the year.

History 

The Raven's Claw Society is very loyal and has been a part of Dickinson's history for over 100 years. While the members of the group are known, the majority of their actions and traditions are concealed. The group prides itself in serving the Dickinson College and Carlisle, Pennsylvania communities through discreet service activities. The group's alumni organization is also responsible for founding one of the college's largest scholarship funds and the McAndrews Fund for athletics. Additionally, there are many buildings on campus named after Raven's Claw members in recognition of their generous service and dedication to the College and/or large financial contributions to the school.

Alumni

Business 
Merkel Landis, President of Carlisle Trust Company, responsible for establishing the first Christmas club savings fund. 
Robert M. Waidner, President of Standard Fusee Corporation.
George V. Hager, Chairman and CEO of Genesis HealthCare Corporation.
John R. Stafford, CEO of American Home Products International Inc.
Gary A. Poliner, CFO and Executive Vice President of Northwestern Mutual Financial Network.
Doug Pauls, BankUnited Chief Financial Officer.
Abram Bosler, President of Carlisle Deposit Bank and Carlisle Shoe Company; President of the Carlisle City Council; Co-founder of Carlisle Country Club
David S. Freysinger, Executive Vice President of Reliant Energy, Inc.
Kyle Miller, President and CEO of Hudson Castle Group, Inc.
Richard W. Schey, Partner, Management Committee, Regional Coordinator, New England Offices of Jackson Lewis LLP; Author of 'The New Jersey Wage and Hour Handbook.'
Daniel J. Sheridan, President and Chief Operating Officer, Extensis Group LLC.

Arts and entertainment 
Philip Capice, television producer (Raven's Claw Productions). 
Leon Rose, President of the New York Knicks and former prominent sports agent to LeBron James and others.
John Griesemer, Motion Picture and Television Actor, Author of No One Thinks Of Greenland, among others.
Henry Boye, Publisher of the Harvard Business Review.
Byron Quann, president and chief executive officer of Whitaker Center for Science and the Arts.
Hugh Beistle Woodward, prominent 20th Century Conservationist.

Politics and public service 
Edward J. Bonin, member of the U.S. House of Representatives from Pennsylvania
Samuel W. Witwer, politician credited as the "Father of the Illinois Constitution."
S. Walter Stauffer, United States Representative from Pennsylvania and President of the National Lime Association.
Robert E. Woodside, Jr., Pennsylvania State Congressman, Pennsylvania Attorney General and Superior Court Judge.
John D. Hopper, Pennsylvania State Senator.
Henri S. Rauschenbach, Massachusetts State Congressman and Senator.
Dallas Winslow, Delaware Public Service Commissioner and Delaware State Senator. 
Jim Gerlach, U.S. Representative and 2010 Gubernatorial Candidate from Pennsylvania.
Harry Nice, member of the Baltimore City Council and the 50th Governor of Maryland.
Luke Bernstein, Executive Director of the Republican Party of Pennsylvania.
Richard Barclay Surrick, United States federal judge on the United States District Court for the Eastern District of Pennsylvania
Dennis J. Crawford, New Jersey Supreme Court Certified Trial Attorney.
James A. Kenney, III, Judge of the Maryland Court of Special Appeals
Jeffrey Truskey, Senior Legal Counsel for the Chevron Corporation.
John E. Jones III, U.S. District Judge who decided the Dover Intelligent Design Case.  In 2014 he ruled that Pennsylvania's 1996 ban on same-sex marriage was unconstitutional.

Athletics 
W. J. Gobrecht, Author, Historian and Coach.
Dave Webster, Dickinson College Head Men's Lacrosse Coach.
John Carroll (basketball), former Boston Celtics head coach.
Bernie Driscoll, Kutztown University Head Men's Basketball Coach.
Jim Engles, New Jersey Institute of Technology Head Men's Basketball Coach.
Peter J. Sivess, Philadelphia Phillies pitcher and Central Intelligence Agency Cold Warrior.
Steve Hoffman (American football), former NFL player and current NFL coach
Eric Amsler, Miami Heat, Scouting and Player Personnel

Education 
Boyd Lee Spahr, President of Dickinson College Board of Trustees. 
Don W. Llewellyn, Dean of Graduate Legal Studies, Villanova University School of Law 
John "Milt" Davidson, member emeritus of the college’s board of trustees; most senior living Raven's Claw member
Edward A. Polloway, Dean of Graduate Studies and Distinguished Professor of Education, Lynchburg College.
Gilbert "Red" Malcolm, 23rd President of Dickinson College.
Stephen A. Saltzburg, Distinguished University Professor, The George Washington University Law School.
Benjamin James, educator, dean, coach, honorary president, and beloved Dickinsonian.
 Former/current members of the Dickinson College Board of Trustees, among others.

References

External links
Dickinson-Raven's Claw Website
Raven's Claw Website
Article from The Dickinsonian
Dickinson Clubs and Organizations

Collegiate secret societies
Student societies in the United States
Dickinson College
Student organizations established in 1896
1896 establishments in Pennsylvania